Booloo is a 1938 American adventure film directed by Clyde E. Elliott.  It stars Colin Tapley as a British soldier who attempts to prove the existence of a legendary tiger.

Premise 
Captain Robert Rogers, a British Army officer, publishes a book about his father's exploits.  After it is ridiculed as a hoax, Rogers leaves for the Malay Peninsula to prove the existence of Booloo, the legendary tiger that killed his father.

Cast 
 Colin Tapley as Captain Robert Rogers
 Jayne Regan as Kate Jaye
 Michio Itō as Sakai chief
 Herbert DeSouza as Rod DeSouza
 Fred Pullen as Nah Laku
 Mamo Clark as native girl
 Claude King as Major Fenton

Production 
Paramount wanted another jungle adventure film after The Jungle Princess proved popular, and they recruited Clyde E. Elliott to shoot a film in Singapore.  Elliott's two previous Malayan films, Bring 'Em Back Alive and Devil Tiger, had been criticized for lacking authenticity.  Booloo addressed these concerns by using Asian actors when available.  However, Paramount cut much of the footage starring these actors and reshot scenes in Hollywood.  For example, the role of a native girl, originally played by Ratna Asmara, was recast to a Hawaiian actress, Mamo Clark.

Release 
Paramount released Booloo in the US on July 29, 1938.

Reception 
Booloo received negative reviews, which criticized the story and editing.  Frank Nugent of The New York Times called it "an exciting and quite entertaining blend of the real and the make-believe".

References

External links 
 

1938 films
1938 adventure films
American adventure films
Films set in Singapore
Films shot in Singapore
American black-and-white films
1930s English-language films
1930s American films
English-language adventure films